Ships and units of the Royal Australian Navy have received numerous battle honours throughout the navy's history.

Before 1947, battle honours awarded to RAN ships and units were administered solely by the British Admiralty. On 9 June 1947, an Australian "Badges, Names and Honours Committee" was established to administer and make recommendations to the Admiralty (and after the 1964 merger, the Naval department of the British Ministry of Defence) on battle honours, naval heraldry, and ship names. The RAN used the same honours list as the Royal Navy until the 1980s, with the exception of adding a battle honour for service in the Vietnam War. A large scale overhaul of the RAN battle honours system was completed in 2010, which included recognition of post-Vietnam operations, along with previous battles and campaigns not included in the British honours list.

Battle honours awarded to a ship are inherited by subsequent ships of the name. In addition, until 1989, Australian warships would inherit honours from British warships of the same name: for example, the Daring-class destroyer  inherited honours from both the RAN V-class destroyer of the same name and the Royal Navy submarine . One factor behind the change was so that Australia's , the first ship to be named after Newcastle, New South Wales, would not inherit the battle honours of the eight British ships named after Newcastle on Tyne on entering service: most of the awards predated Australia's existence as a nation.

In addition to honours for large-scale battles, naval battle honours also include actions where the opposing side consisted of a single ship. Only three 'action' honours were awarded during the 20th century, with RAN warships receiving all three.

Note: The year ranges given are for the entire scope of the battle honour, particularly for campaigns. Individual ships that did not participate for the full duration were recognised with the battle honour, but with a reduced year range reflecting their participation.

Pre-Federation conflicts
Note: Battle honours in this category were awarded to ships and units of the various colonial navies, and have been inherited by the RAN.

World War I

World War II

1946 to present

Citations

References
Books

News articles

External links
 Royal Australian Navy Campaign and Battle Honours, a virtual battle honour board displaying the battle honours awarded to all Royal Australian Navy ships

History of the Royal Australian Navy
Battle honours
Military awards and decorations of Australia
Royal Australian Navy lists